Lycée Français de Castilla y León or Lycée Français de Valladolid is a French international school in Laguna de Duero, Province of Valladolid, Castile and Leon, Spain, near Valladolid. The school serves ages 3–18, with levels maternelle (preschool) through lycée (high school/sixth form college).

See also
 Liceo Español Luis Buñuel, a Spanish international school near Paris, France

Notes

External links
  Lycée Français de Castilla y León
  Lycée Français de Castilla y León
  Liceo Francés de Castilla y León – Valladolid - Red de Colegios y Liceos Franceses España-Portugal (EFEP)

Buildings and structures in the Province of Valladolid
French international schools in Spain